A list of Bangladesh films released in 1972.

Releases

See also

1972 in Bangladesh
List of Bangladeshi films of 1973
List of Bangladeshi films
Dhallywood
Cinema of Bangladesh

References

External links 
 Bangladeshi films on Internet Movie Database

Film
Bangladesh
 1972